Ponikve is a settlement in the Municipality of Dobrepolje in Slovenia. The area is part of the historical region of Lower Carniola. The municipality is now included in the Central Slovenia Statistical Region.

Name
The name Ponikve is a plural form derived from the word ponikva 'influent stream' or 'sinkhole' (into which such a stream disappears). In its plural form it refers to a gently rolling landscape consisting of the basins of an influent stream. Like other villages named Ponikve and similar names (e.g., Ponikva), it refers to a local landscape element. In the past the German name was Ponique.

Church

The local church is dedicated to Saint Florian and belongs to the Parish of Dobrepolje–Videm. It is a Gothic building that was extensively rebuilt in the 18th century.

References

External links

Ponikve on Geopedia

Populated places in the Municipality of Dobrepolje